The 7th Aerobic Gymnastics World Championships were held in Žvejų rūmai hall, Klaipėda, Lithuania from 29 to 31 July 2002.

Results

Women's Individual

Men's Individual

Mixed Pair

Trio

Group All-Around

Medal table

References
FIG official site
UEG European Union of Gymnastics Statistics

Aerobic Gymnastics Championships
Aerobic Gymnastics World Championships
Aerobic Gymnastics World Championships
Aerobic Gymnastics World Championships
Gymnastics competitions in Lithuania
International sports competitions hosted by Lithuania